Opostega stiriella is a moth of the family Opostegidae. It was described by Edward Meyrick in 1881. It is known from New South Wales, Australia.

References

Opostegidae
Moths described in 1881